Pseudophosphorus norrisii is a species of beetle in the family Cerambycidae, and the only species in the genus Pseudophosphorus. It was first described by J.O. Westwood in 1836, under the name Lamia norrisii (in honour of the naturalist Thomas Norris). It is found in Côte d'Ivoire, Sierra Leone, and Nigeria.

References

Tragocephalini
Beetles described in 1836